The Columbia Commercial Historic District encompasses a historically significant portion of the central business district of Columbia, South Carolina.  It includes portions of three blocks of Main Street between Laurel and Hampton Streets, as well as individual buildings on adjacent streets.  It includes the full length of Main Streets east side on these blocks, but only the central block (between Blanding and Taylor Streets) on the west side, extending slightly south of Taylor.  This area best illustrates the city's commercial and economic growth for a century, from the end of the American Civil War to about 1963, with a broad diversity of architectural styles found in a small area.

The district was added to the National Register of Historic Places in 2014, and has twice been enlarged.  Nine of the district's 36 buildings are also individually listed.

See also
National Register of Historic Places listings in Columbia, South Carolina

References

Historic districts on the National Register of Historic Places in South Carolina
Buildings and structures in Columbia, South Carolina
National Register of Historic Places in Columbia, South Carolina